Edwin Whitfield "Goat" Hale (January 29, 1896 – March 25, 1983) was an American football player for the Mississippi College Collegians who was elected to the College Football Hall of Fame. After playing, he served many years as a coach.

Early years
Hale was born in Jackson, Mississippi and played high school football at its Central High School. Hale got the nickname "Goat" playing there against Brookhaven in 1914. He battered through the line, scoring a touchdown, and ran past the end zone until his head hit a wooden building, loosening several planks.

Mississippi College
"Goat" played quarterback at Mississippi College from 1915 to 1916 and again from 1920 to 1921, after serving in World War I. He was nominated though not selected for an Associated Press All-Time Southeast 1869-1919 era team.  He was elected to the Mississippi Sports Hall of Fame in 1961, and the College Football Hall of Fame in 1963. Hale was also inducted into the Millsaps College Sports Hall of Fame in 1970. He is the name sake of the Hale in Robinson-Hale Stadium, wherein Mississippi College plays it home games. He stood 5'11" and weighed 170 pounds.

World War I
During the war he was wounded, reported missing, and found later in a hospital in France.

1921
In 1921, Hale scored 161 points and gained 2,160 yards as he was selected All-Southern.  "Ten other players are on Hale's teams, but they are there merely to conform with gridiron rules."

Death
Hale died in 1983; he was 87 years old.

Head coaching record

Football

References

External links
 

1896 births
1983 deaths
American football quarterbacks
College Football Hall of Fame inductees
Millsaps Majors football coaches
Mississippi College Choctaws football coaches
Mississippi College Choctaws football players
Mississippi State Bulldogs men's basketball coaches
Mississippi State Bulldogs football coaches
Ole Miss Rebels baseball coaches
Ole Miss Rebels football coaches
Ole Miss Rebels men's basketball coaches
Southern Miss Golden Eagles football coaches
Sportspeople from Jackson, Mississippi
Coaches of American football from Mississippi
Players of American football from Jackson, Mississippi
Basketball coaches from Mississippi